Defectrix is a monotypic genus of Panamanian huntsman spiders containing the single species, Defectrix defectrix. It was first described by Alexander Ivanovitch Petrunkevitch in 1925, and is found in Panama.

See also
 List of Sparassidae species

References

Monotypic Araneomorphae genera
Sparassidae
Spiders of Central America